Trados Studio is a computer-assisted translation software tool which offers a complete, centralised translation environment for editing, reviewing and managing translation projects and terminology- either offline in a desktop tool or online in the cloud. Trados Studio is part of the Trados product portfolio, a suite of intelligent translation products owned by RWS that enables freelance translators, language service providers (LSPs) and corporations to streamline processes and improve efficiencies while keeping costs down. 

The UK-based company RWS, who offer technology-enabled language, content management and intellectual property services, is considered the market leader in providing translation software across the entire translation supply chain.

History
Trados Studio is the successor of Translators Workbench, originally developed by the German company Trados GmbH. It was renamed SDL Trados in 2005 when Trados was bought by SDL plc. The name reverted to Trados Studio after SDL merged with RWS in 2020. 

Trados GmbH was founded as a language-service provider (LSP) in 1984 by Jochen Hummel and Iko Knyphausen in Stuttgart, Germany. The company began developing translation software in the late 1980s, and released the first Windows versions of two of the suite's major components in the early 1990s – MultiTerm in 1992, and Translator's Workbench in 1994.  

Trados was acquired by SDL in 2005, who was then acquired by RWS on 4 November 2020.

Configuration
Trados Studio 2022 is the latest release of this computer-assisted translation tool. It is delivered with several tools and applications, including: 

Trados Studio 

The main desktop-based application providing a complete environment to edit or review translations, manage translation projects, organize terminology, and connect to machine translation. The latest edition, Trados Studio 2022, also provides users with cloud capabilities, enabling them to choose between desktop ways of working, cloud, or a combination of both. 

Trados Studio cloud capabilities 

The free essential cloud capabilities available with Trados Studio 2022 are built on the RWS Language Cloud platform, a scalable solution providing multiple subscription offerings. This entry level offering enables users to connect to the cloud whilst working in Trados Studio to securely back up their work. There is also an online editor, so users can translate in a browser from any device. 

MultiTerm 

A terminology management tool that is integrated with Trados Studio for adding, editing and managing terms. It is also provided as a standalone tool. 

RWS AppStore 

An online store enabling users to customise and extend the functionality of their Trados solution. Apps provide users different ways to manage your translation, review and terminology process. There are over hundreds of apps available, of which the majority are designed for Trados Studio. If you are using Trados Studio 2021 or 2022, you can manage your applications from within the Trados Studio interface.

Supported source document formats
Trados Studio supports a very wide range of file types so that you are fully equipped to work on any project, including: various markup and tagged formats such as ML, XML, HTML, XLIFF, SDLXLIFF (Studio's native format for translation), OpenDocument files; straight text files; source code files, such as Java and Microsoft .NET; Microsoft Word, ExcelPowerPoint; and some Adobe file formats, such as PDF, scanned PDF (OCR is included), FrameMaker, InDesign, and InCopy. Support for other file types such as Multilingual Excel and Multilingual XML are also available through apps on the RWS AppStore. Learn more about supported formats and languages in Trados Studio here.

Handling of translation memories and glossaries 

The translation memory (TM) format of Trados Studio is SDLTM, which consists in a particular SQLite database. 

When creating a new (file-based) translation memory, Trados Studio creates a database file in which all translation units are stored. The translation memory also stores structural and context information to link all the different segments and their position in a document. This allows the tool to select the most relevant translation memory segment. 

Trados Studio can also work with server-based translation memories by connecting to Trados GroupShare, or cloud-based translation memories from Trados Team or Trados Enterprise. 

Glossaries are handled by the MultiTerm application. Glossaries can be bilingual or multi-lingual, file-based or server based.

Integration of machine translation and postediting
Trados Studio has integrated machine translation and postediting into its translation workflow. If the appropriate parameter setting is made, Trados Studio will insert a machine translation of a translation unit (TU) if no match is found in the translation memory. The translator can then post-edit the machine translation for added clarity. Trados currently supports their own machine translation, Language Weaver, plus dozens of third-party machine translation providers through apps available on the RWS AppStore. Trados Studio also supports the integration of other MT providers through its open API.

Interoperability with other CAT tools 
Trados Studio opens standard file formats, including XLIFF (1.2 and 2.0), TMX, TBX and OLIF, out-the-box.  

In addition, Trados Studio also natively supports file types from other CAT tools including; memoQ, XLIFF, Memsource XLIFF and PO documents from GNU gettext. In addition, you can download apps from the RWS AppStore to add support for other file formats such as: 

 Multilingual XML filetype- allowing users to create multilingual Trados Studio projects for any bilingual or multilingual XML-based format (including XLIFF flavours from other tools).  

 Trados Compatibility and Migration Power Pack - for compatibility with Bilingual DOC(X) (Trados 2007 and earlier, Wordfast Classic), TTX (Trados 2007 and earlier), ITD (SDL TMS and SDLX),  
 Wordfast TXML  
 WorldServer Compatibility Pack for Trados Studio - enabling you to handle WorldServer packages  
 Lingotek TMS plugin for Trados Studio – providing support for workflows using Lingotek TMS

RWS Community   
RWS has an online community where users can go to ask questions, discuss topics with peers, suggest product enhancements and vote on other’s ideas. There is a specific community for the Trados product portfolio, split into product forums for ease of use. This community is free to access. RWS employees also monitor and respond to customer posts, providing help where required.

Support for Developers 
Trados has a developer community. All products within the Trados product portfolio have public APIs, enabling users to develop their own integrated applications if required. Their developer hub links to all the information you need as a developer to learn how to connect your platforms, improve efficiencies, and extend the functionality of your Trados tools.

References

Translation software